Karen Anne Spencer, Countess Spencer (formerly Gordon, née Villeneuve; born June 6, 1972) is a Canadian social entrepreneur. She is the founder and CEO of Whole Child International, a U.S.-based non-governmental organization (NGO) that works to improve the quality of care for vulnerable children.

Life and career
Countess Spencer was born Karen Anne Villeneuve on November 30, 1972 in Edmonton, Alberta, Canada, the eldest of three children. Her father’s career as a National Parks administrator required her family to move to as many as 23 homes and 10 schools during her childhood; Spencer has credited this experience as the foundation for her interest in helping children without a stable home.

Spencer was motivated to launch the nonprofit organization Whole Child International, which targets the emotional needs of society’s most at-risk children, after attending a 2004 parenting class that introduced the child-rearing approach of Emmi Pikler.

Whole Child is currently implementing programs with funding from USAID, the Inter-American Development Bank, the Korean Poverty Reduction Fund, and other donors such as David G. Booth, the Annenberg Foundation, and the Pamella and Daniel DeVos Foundation.

In February 2010, the 14th Dalai Lama gave his support to Whole Child at the launch of its global initiative to raise awareness of the plight of institutionalized children.

Karen Spencer is co-author of articles published in the peer-reviewed Infant Journal of Mental Health and Perspectives in Infant Mental Health, contributing important insights and realistic solutions to the public debate. In September 2015, she was elected an Ashoka Fellow  for her work as a social entrepreneur by the Ashoka Foundation, which honoured her for identifying and filling a gap in care for orphans and vulnerable children. In 2016 she was made a Fellow at the University of Northampton in the United Kingdom. In 2017, she received the Pikler/Lóczy USA Founders Award, and People Magazine named her one of "25 Women Changing the World."

She reportedly divides her time between her home in Pacific Palisades, California, and her husband's family seat at Althorp in Northamptonshire, United Kingdom.

Marriages and children
The Countess married Mark Gordon, a Hollywood producer whose films include Saving Private Ryan and The Patriot, on November 8, 1997. The couple divorced in 2003. Together they have two daughters, Emma (b. 1998) and Kate (b. 2001).

On June 25, 2011, Spencer married Charles Spencer, 9th Earl Spencer at Althorp. The Earl Spencer is the brother of the late Diana, Princess of Wales, and is an author and broadcaster. As a result of her marriage, Karen Spencer is formally styled The Right Honourable The Countess Spencer, and is addressed as Lady Spencer.

The Earl and Countess Spencer have one child together: Lady Charlotte Diana Spencer, born 30 July 2012 at Althorp.

References

External links
 
 Staff - website of Whole Child International

1972 births
Living people
British countesses
Canadian philanthropists
People from Edmonton
Canadian female models
Canadian expatriates in the United States
Canadian humanitarians
Women humanitarians
Canadian socialites
Karen
Canadian women philanthropists
Ashoka Canada Fellows